Problepsis clemens is a moth of the family Geometridae. It is found in Australia (Queensland).

References

Moths described in 1890
Scopulini
Moths of Australia